Adam & Eve is an American conglomerate company that sells adult products through e-commerce. In 2004, it was the largest e-commerce distributor of condoms, sex toys, and erotica in the United States. Its parent company, PHE Inc., is the largest private employer in Hillsborough, North Carolina, where its headquarters are situated. The company funds non-profit social marketing organizations that address issues such as population growth, disease control and sex education in developing countries.

Origins
The firm was founded in 1970 by physician Tim Black and Phil Harvey. It started as a small storefront in Chapel Hill, North Carolina, selling condoms and lubricants. It soon became a mail-order catalog selling contraceptives through non-medical channels.

While still graduate students at the University of North Carolina's School of Public Health, they conceived the firm to fund a non-profit organization to using the profits to finance family-planning programs in developing countries.

With a Ford Foundation fellowship, they devised a plan to use social marketing in the U.S., and with university consent, they began writing witty ad copy ("What will you get her this Christmas -- pregnant?") and advertising condoms in the mail and in 300 of the largest U.S. college newspapers. Though selling condoms via the mail was in violation of the Comstock Act (not overturned  in its entirety until 1972), they knew the law was rarely enforced. They began to see a profit, stating, "The mail-order condom market was just sitting there waiting for somebody," recalls Harvey. "

Philanthropy

Population Services International

With business generating   enough revenue to cover costs, the partners wondered if the condom business could create enough of a profit to finance overseas social-marketing projects. If so, they would have the ability to bypass conventional donors and function with complete autonomy. With that, the men launched Population Services International (PSI), and by 1975 were conducting condom marketing programs in Bangladesh and Kenya. Though Harvey left his position as the director in the late 1970s, PSI still sells birth control and health products in over 60 countries and is prominent in international family planning.

DKT International

In the late 1970s, Harvey focused more on running Adam & Eve, but in 1989, he also launched DKT International (DKT), an organization that promotes family planning and HIV/AIDS prevention in Africa, Asia, and Latin America. Much of its revenue comes from its sales of low-cost contraceptives, but Adam & Eve also donates more than 25% of its profits. While its biggest programs draw funding from government agencies and foundations, its private funding allows it to greater freedom. Its social marketing strategies have included advertising, creating location-specific brands, working with local social networks and militaries, and targeting high-risk groups.

Company overview
Along with Adam & Eve's brand of erotic toys, the firm carries a variety of items for men, women and couples. In 2004, it started franchising its stores in the U.S. In 2009, the company donated funds to the Free Speech Coalition. In 2019, it acquired the Excite Group, Australia's largest online adult retailer.

References

Further reading
 Philip D. Harvey, The Government Vs. Erotica: The Siege of Adam and Eve, Prometheus Books, 2001, .

External links
 

Sex shops
Companies based in North Carolina
Companies based in Hillsborough, North Carolina
American companies established in 1970
Retail companies established in 1970
Adam and Eve
1970 establishments in North Carolina